Breakout is the tenth album by Spyro Gyra, released in 1986.  It was the last album co-produced by Richard Calandra, who died of cancer in October 1986.

The band produced a music video for the song "Bob Goes to the Store" that was partially shot from the point of view of a roaming dog ("Bob").

Track listing 
"Bob Goes to the Store" (Kim Stone) – 4:36
"Freefall" (Jay Beckenstein) – 4:52
"Doubletake" (Jay Beckenstein) – 4:05
"Breakout" (Jeremy Wall) – 4:37
"Body Wave" (Richie Morales, Mark Gray) – 4:09
"Whirlwind" (Dave Samuels) – 5:37
"Swept Away" (Jeremy Wall) – 5:43
"Guiltless" (Tom Schuman) – 5:10

Personnel 
Spyro Gyra
 Jay Beckenstein – saxophones
 Tom Schuman – keyboards
 Dave Samuels – KAT Polyphonic mallet synthesizer, vibraphone, marimba
 Julio Fernández – guitars
 Kim Stone – bass guitar
 Richie Morales – drums
 Manolo Badrena – percussion

Additional Personnel
 Eddie Jobson – Synclavier programming

Production 
 Jay Beckenstein – producer 
 Richard Calandra – producer
 Jeremy Wall – co-producer
 Larry Swist – engineer, front cover illustration 
 Chris Bubacz – assistant engineer
 Bob Ludwig – mastering at Masterdisk (New York, NY).
 Jeff Adamoff – art direction 
 Spencer Drate – art direction, design 
 Judith Salavetz – design
 Duane Michals – rear cover photography
 Phil Brennan – management

References

1986 albums
Spyro Gyra albums
MCA Records albums